Housebound is a 2014 New Zealand horror comedy film written, edited, and directed by Gerard Johnstone, in his feature film directorial debut. The film had its world premiere on 10 March 2014, at South by Southwest and stars Morgana O'Reilly as a woman sentenced to house arrest in a potentially haunted house.

Plot

Kylie Bucknell, a troubled young woman, attempts to steal the safe from an ATM but the police capture her. Due to her history of recidivism, she is sentenced to house arrest for eight months under the care of her mother, Miriam. Kylie does not get along with either her mother or her step-father, Graeme. A security contractor, Amos, explains that Kylie's ankle monitor will alert the police if she ever leaves the premises of her mother's house.

Kylie is further frustrated when Miriam claims the house is haunted. After a disembodied hand grabs her in the basement, Kylie becomes convinced that an intruder is in the house. Amos takes Miriam's suggestion of a haunting seriously, and promises to return with ghost hunting equipment. After a series of unexplained experiences, Kylie comes to believe there may truly be a ghost in the house. Dennis, Kylie's clinical psychologist, becomes concerned with what he believes to be delusions in Miriam and Kylie. Graeme reveals that their home was once a halfway house and the site of a horrific murder. They discover evidence of the crime, including an orthodontic retainer.

When Kylie and Amos discover that her neighbour uses a retainer, Kylie breaks into the man's house as she attempts to take his retainer. After she flees back home and hides in the basement, she panics and accidentally stabs Graeme. Amos attempts to break into her neighbour's house next but the neighbour says that he is not the killer. He tells the story of a young savant, Eugene, whom he adopted. Eugene is an expert at mechanics and electronics, and disappeared a year before the killing, though the neighbour believes him to be responsible.

Kylie discovers Eugene's secret hallways in their house. She and Amos converge at the police station, and Amos corroborates her wild stories of a serial killer living in the hidden passageways. However, the police find no evidence, and Dennis convinces all involved that it would be best if Kylie were institutionalized. Once Dennis reveals that he wears a retainer, Kylie becomes suspicious of him. When she confronts him with evidence that he was an intern at the halfway house, he attempts to kill Miriam and Kylie, while incapacitating Amos. Kylie and Miriam flee into the secret tunnels, where they encounter Eugene.

Realizing that their paranormal activity has been Eugene all this time, they are at first frightened but realize that he is friendly. Dennis stabs Eugene, knocks out Kylie, and begins to strangle Miriam. Eugene wakes Kylie and hands her a weapon, which she uses to stab Dennis. Eugene throws a switch, and high voltage explodes Dennis' head. Months later, all have recovered, Amos removes Kylie's ankle monitor, and Eugene has seemingly become an accepted (albeit mostly unseen) member of the household.

Cast
Morgana O'Reilly as Kylie Bucknell
Rima Te Wiata as Miriam Bucknell
Glen-Paul Waru as Amos
Cameron Rhodes as Dennis
Ross Harper as Graeme
Ryan Lampp as Eugene
Mick Innes as Mads Kraglund
Bruce Hopkins as Officer Carson 
Millen Baird as Officer Grayson
Wallace Chapman as Mr. Hollis
Nikki Si’ulepa as Leslie
Ian Mune as Judge

Production
Johnstone was first inspired to create a horror film after watching Ghosthunters on television and received additional inspiration from classic films such as The Changeling and The Legend of Hell House. While writing the script Johnstone wanted the character of Kylie to be "someone that wouldn't scare easily. That way, when she does finally fall victim to fear, it's much more palpable." He experienced some difficulty in achieving the film's exterior shots of the house, as budgetary issues limited their options of homes and renovations to the exterior of their chosen house during the course of filming also raised some issues.

Release
Housebound had its world premiere at the South by Southwest film festival on 11 March 2014.

Reception
Rotten Tomatoes, a review aggregator, reports that 95% of 42 surveyed critics gave the film a positive review; the average rating is 7.54/10. The site's consensus reads: "Alternately hilarious, gross, and simply diverting, Housebound is the rare horror-comedy that delivers on both fronts." Metacritic rated it 76/100 based on 10 reviews.

Hitfix gave it an A and wrote "sometimes at the festival you walk into a room knowing nothing, sit down, and get your skull punched in by a movie that is calibrated perfectly, that knows exactly what it wants to do, and that seems almost unnaturally confident considering it was made by a first-time feature director". Fangoria praised the film, rating it at 3 out of 4 stars and stating that it "neatly carries some universal ideas about throwing away childish indignation and rebellion, and getting to know your parents as people with pasts and personal lives, not just nagging overseers." Shock Till You Drop also gave Housebound a positive rating, as they considered it one of the highlights of South by Southwest.  Movies.com  said it was a breath of fresh air for the often stale haunted-house genre. Badass Digest told readers they had "a new favorite horror film of 2014". Chuck Bowen of Slant Magazine rated it 2.5/4 stars and wrote that each of the film's elements are "competently and engagingly orchestrated" but do not combine into a coherent whole.

Awards and nominations

Remake
In February 2015, New Line Cinema announced the production of a US remake. Original writer and director Gerard Johnstone is set with Dave Neustadter and Walter Hamada as executive producer for New Line.

References

External links
 
 
 

2014 films
2014 comedy horror films
Films set in 2013
New Zealand comedy horror films
2014 directorial debut films
Films set in Auckland
Films shot in New Zealand
2010s English-language films